Ark Herb Farm is a 20-acre farm in Santa Barbara de Heredia, approximately 3 miles (5 kilometres) northwest of Heredia, Costa Rica on the slopes of the Poás Volcano. The farm grows 300 varieties of herbs and fruit.

References

External links
 Official site

Farms in Costa Rica